Marloes Keetels (born 4 May 1993) is a Dutch field hockey player.

Keetels has played for the Netherlands women's national field hockey team since 2013. She was a member of the Netherlands team that won the 2014 Women's Hockey World Cup.

See also
 List of Youth Olympic Games gold medalists who won Olympic gold medals

References

External links
 

1993 births
Living people
Dutch female field hockey players
Field hockey players at the 2010 Summer Youth Olympics
People from Schijndel
Medalists at the 2016 Summer Olympics
Olympic silver medalists for the Netherlands
Olympic medalists in field hockey
Field hockey players at the 2016 Summer Olympics
Field hockey players at the 2020 Summer Olympics
Olympic field hockey players of the Netherlands
Female field hockey midfielders
HC Den Bosch players
Youth Olympic gold medalists for the Netherlands
Olympic gold medalists for the Netherlands
Medalists at the 2020 Summer Olympics
Sportspeople from North Brabant
21st-century Dutch women